The 2024 United States House of Representatives elections in Oregon will be held on November 5, 2024, to elect the 6 U.S. representatives from the State of Oregon, one from each of the state's congressional districts. The elections will coincide with the 2024 U.S. presidential election, as well as other elections to the House of Representatives, elections to the United States Senate, and various state and local elections.

District 4

The 4th district includes the southern Willamette Valley and parts of the South and Central Coasts, including Eugene, Corvallis, and Roseburg. The incumbent is Democrat Val Hoyle, who was elected with 50.6% of the vote in 2022.

Democratic primary

Candidates

Potential
Val Hoyle, incumbent U.S. Representative

General election

Predictions

District 5

The 5th district includes portions of the Portland suburbs, also stretching southwards through the eastern parts of Marion and Linn counties to Bend. The incumbent is Republican Lori Chavez-DeRemer, who flipped the district and was elected with 51.1% of the vote in 2022.

Republican primary

Candidates

Filed paperwork
Lori Chavez-DeRemer, incumbent U.S. Representative

Democratic primary

Candidates

Declined
Kurt Schrader, former U.S. Representative

General election

Predictions

District 6

The 6th district consists of Polk County and Yamhill County, in addition to portions of Marion County (including the state capital, Salem), Clackamas County, and Washington County. The incumbent is Democrat Andrea Salinas, who was elected with 50.1% of the vote in 2022.

Democratic primary

Candidates

Potential
Andrea Salinas, incumbent U.S. Representative

General election

Predictions

References

2024
Oregon
United States House of Representatives